Vojsko ( or) is a dispersed settlement in the hills west of Idrija in the traditional Inner Carniola region of Slovenia. It has a cluster of buildings centered on the parish church at its centre, and includes a number of smaller hamlets as well as remote farmsteads in the surrounding hills.

Name
The name Vojsko arose through ellipsis from the noun phrase *vojьsko (selo) 'military settlement'. The name did not derive from visoko 'high', as sometimes hypothesized.

Church
The parish church is dedicated to Saint Joseph and belongs to the Koper Diocese.

Weather station 
A weather station was installed at Vojsko in July 1928. Initially, it was used solely for measuring precipitation, but since November 1958 it has recorded all common meteorological observations.

References

External links
Vojsko on Geopedia

Populated places in the Municipality of Idrija